Shane Patrick Paul Roche (born 11 March 1964), known as Shane Richie, is a British actor, comedian, television presenter and singer. Following initial success as a stage and screen performer, he became best known for his portrayal of the character Alfie Moon in the BBC One soap opera EastEnders (appearing 2002–2005, 2010–2016, 2018–2019, 2022–present) and then in its spin-off RTÉ Drama Redwater in 2017. In 2020, he appeared on the twentieth series of I'm a Celebrity...Get Me Out of Here and finished in fourth place.

Richie has presented a number of BBC game shows including Reflex, Win Your Wish List and Decimate.

He also regularly appears in pantomime and in the last few years has starred as Robin Hood. He first took the role appearing at the Mayflower Theatre, Southampton in 2016, then repeated it again in 2017 at the New Victoria Theatre, Woking. He then reprised the role once again in 2018 at the Milton Keynes Theatre. In 2019 he starred alongside Jennie Dale as the title character in  Dick Whittington at the Bristol Hippodrome in Bristol.

Early life and career beginnings
Richie was born at St Mary Abbots Hospital in Kensington, London to Irish parents. He attended Willesden High School and was a member of a youth theatre as a child, and began his professional career in adolescence as a bluecoat entertainer at a Pontins holiday camp Little Canada, on the Isle of Wight. He progressed to the live stand up circuit – receiving a nomination for best new stand-up at the inaugural British Comedy Awards.

In 1989, Richie made nightly appearances for Sky TV's chat show series Jameson Tonight, which was hosted by Derek Jameson and Richie and recorded at the Windmill Theatre, London. In 1990, Richie made his first terrestrial television appearances as one of the comics on the BBC One sketch show Up to Something! with Suzy Aitchison, David Schneider, Frances Dodge, Mike Hayley and Lewis MacLeod; however, the show was axed after one series. Richie was one of five comics along with Maddi Cryer, Annette Law, George Marshall and Billy Pearce.

Richie later branched out into hosting game shows after proving successful as host of the kids' quiz show Run the Risk, which was played during the BBC Saturday morning show Going Live. He moved into mainstream presenting with Caught in the Act, Win, Lose or Draw, The Shane Richie Experience (later revamped as Love Me Do) and Lucky Numbers. He also replaced Danny Baker in the 'doorstep challenge' TV ads for Daz detergent; he had previously replaced Baker as host of Win, Lose or Draw. In the 2012 Christmas episode of The Sarah Millican Television Programme, Richie said that Daz gave him so much money for doing the adverts that he would have "snorted the stuff" if they had asked him.

Career

Musicals and music career
Richie has had success in musicals, appearing in such musicals as Boogie Nights and the 1993 London revival production of Grease. He released two albums, The Album in 1997 and Once Around the Sun in 2000 to limited commercial response, and had a number 2 hit in the UK Singles Chart in 2003, with his Children in Need cover version of Wham!'s "I'm Your Man".

Over Christmas 2005, Richie appeared in a touring run of Scrooge: The Musical.

In 2009, Richie was reportedly scheduled as the opening act for Michael Jackson's concerts at the O2 Arena. The concerts were cancelled following Jackson's death.

During Christmas 2009, 2013 and 2014, Richie appeared as Aladdin, Buttons and Dick Whittington, in the pantomimes Aladdin, Cinderella and Dick Whittington at the Wycombe Swan Theatre in High Wycombe.

In 2017, Richie signed with East West Records and released his debut country music album, A Country Soul on 10 November 2017, which featured songs co-written by his son, Rixton member Jake Roche.

Television
Richie was a regular co-host alongside Derek Jameson on "Jameson Tonight", an early Sky One talk show in 1990. 

In 1995, Richie began hosting the game show Lucky Numbers and starred in The Shane Richie Experience (1995–1996).

From 2002 to 2003, Richie played the villainous Danny Dexter on Night and Day. He won supporting roles in low-profile British films, beginning with Chris Barfoot'''s award-winning short comedy movie Dead Clean and then later Distant Shadow. In 2003, Richie was executive producer for the British film Shoreditch, in which he also appeared in a lead role. He invested a six-figure sum into the budget of the film, which ultimately made little profit.

In 2007, Richie starred in ITV drama The Good Samaritan, and Father Frank for BBC One. He also starred in the second series of Skins on Channel 4 as Bruce Gelcart, a lecherous college drama lecturer.

On 11 May 2008, Richie hosted a quiz show on Sky1 called Don't Forget the Lyrics!, whereby contestants must finish off the lyrics to lines of popular songs in order to win money.

On 25 April 2008, he was due to be a guest on The Paul O'Grady Show, but due to Paul O'Grady falling ill, Richie stood in as host.

In February 2009, Richie starred in a revamp of the series Minder on Channel 5. Rather than a remake of the original, Richie starred as Archie Daley, the nephew of the character Arthur Daley from the original series, which ran from 1979 to 1994 on ITV.

On 26 July 2009, Richie appeared in a one-off television drama called Whatever It Takes playing a character called JJ Merrick who comes to the aid of a girl who wins a radio competition – and catapults her into stardom, thus giving her a new lease of life.

The BBC announced on 14 November 2011, that following Jimmy Savile's recent death, Jim'll Fix It would return for a one-off Christmas Special in December 2011, with Richie as host.

In January 2014, Richie presented one series of BBC One game show Reflex, made by Objective Productions. In December 2014, Richie began hosting The National Lottery: Win Your Wish List, a new Saturday night game show. A second series began airing in February 2016.

Richie has guest-hosted numerous episodes of The One Show. Between 2015 and 2016, Richie presented the BBC One daytime game show Decimate.

In June 2015, it was announced that he would be appearing in an episode of Benidorm.

In 2019 Richie filmed Caravanning With Shane Richie for Channel 5.

In November 2020, it was announced that Richie would appear on the twentieth series of I'm a Celebrity...Get Me Out of Here. He finished in fourth place.

EastEnders

In 2002, Richie joined the cast of EastEnders as Alfie Moon, bringing humour to a programme often panned for being too depressing. The role won him numerous awards including the award for "Best Male European Actor" at the Rose D'or Festival and National Television Awards for "Most Popular Actor" in 2005, shortly before he, and co-star Jessie Wallace, left the programme on Christmas Day in 2005.

On 8 May 2008, he said in an interview with Digital Spy that he would love to return to EastEnders as Alfie Moon.

On 23 July 2009, Richie announced on The One Show that his character Alfie Moon would return to EastEnders. Following an absence of almost five years, Richie made his on-screen return to EastEnders on 21 September 2010.

As well as appearing in EastEnders, Richie also narrated three episodes for the documentary series, EastEnders Revealed, a series that goes behind the scenes and explores characters and storylines; the episodes were "The Secret Mitchell" in 2009 about Ronnie Mitchell and Danielle Jones, "Peggy Mitchell – Queen of the Vic" in 2010 about Peggy Mitchell and "Farewell Pat" in 2012 about Pat Evans.

On 4 April 2015, it was announced that Richie would appear alongside Jessie Wallace in a six-part BBC One drama series, Redwater. In the spin-off, Kat and Alfie Moon visited Ireland as they put their past behind them. Speaking about the series, Richie commented: "Both Jessie and I are absolutely thrilled to be given this amazing opportunity. To have a whole drama focussed around Kat and Alfie is a huge honour for us both and we just can't wait to start filming.

Richie briefly reprised the role in 2018, with the character leaving once again in early 2019.

In July 2022, it was announced that Richie would reprise the role of Alfie once again, returning to the soap in the Autumn.

Film
In 2003, Richie produced and starred in the film Shoreditch, into which he had reportedly invested half a million pounds of his own money. The film received negative reviews and was not widely seen.Shoreditch (2003). Internet Movie Database

In 2006, Richie played a rat named Sid in the Aardman Animation film Flushed Away. He has recently been seen in the UK stage tour of One Flew Over the Cuckoo's Nest as Randle McMurphy, and heard as a presenter on Virgin Radio, where he interviewed Tony Hadley of Spandau Ballet.

Stage

In July 2015 it was announced that Richie would star alongside Jessie Wallace in The Perfect Murder at the Theatre Royal in February 2016.

Since 2016, he has appeared in pantomime as Robin Hood.

In 2019, Richie starred as retired drag queen Hugo Battersby/ Loco Chanelle in the hit musical Everybody's Talking About Jamie at the Apollo Theatre. It was then announced that he would reprise the role for the 2020 UK tour.

Richie married Coleen Nolan in 1990 and together they had two sons, Shane Roche Jr. (born 1988) and Jake Roche (born 1992). They divorced in 1999. He has three children with wife Christie.

In 2003, Richie released his autobiography Rags to Richie. In the book, he claims to have had sex with six girls in a chalet, during his time as a Pontins Bluecoat and he broke the law by orchestrating ticket touts outside of Grease. Richie also claims to have given free tickets to the touts, who went on to sell them at a large profit for Richie.

Charity
Richie is patron of Shinfield Players Theatre, an amateur little theatre in Reading, Berkshire, taking the role from Anton Rodgers who died in 2007. He made his first appearance in the audience on 11 July 2009 for the Youth Group production of Disco Inferno.

Richie is patron of the UK's Huntington's Disease Association.

Richie is also a patron of a charity called Cherry Trees which provides respite care for children with disabilities.

In 2019, Richie admitted that he had to live in a squat when a job failed to happen.  After the squat was raided by police, he ended up homeless and was cautioned by the police for vagrancy.  Of the experience, Richie said "What I learnt almost 40 years ago has had, and will always have, a lasting effect on me."

Filmography
Film

Television

 Discography 

 1997 – The Album 2000 – Once Around the Sun 2017 – A Country Soul''

References

External links

 
 
 
 
 

21st-century English male actors
Comedians from London
English game show hosts
English male singers
English male comedians
English male film actors
English male soap opera actors
English male stage actors
English people of Irish descent
English television presenters
People from Kensington
1964 births
Living people
I'm a Celebrity...Get Me Out of Here! (British TV series) participants
English Roman Catholics